Uncertainty analysis investigates the uncertainty of variables that are used in decision-making problems in which observations and models represent the knowledge base. In other words, uncertainty analysis aims to make a technical contribution to decision-making through the quantification of uncertainties in the relevant variables.

Physical experiments 
In physical experiments uncertainty analysis, or experimental uncertainty assessment, deals with assessing the uncertainty in a measurement. An experiment designed to determine an effect, demonstrate a law, or estimate the numerical value of a physical variable will be affected by errors due to instrumentation, methodology, presence of confounding effects and so on. Experimental uncertainty estimates are needed to assess the confidence in the results. A related field is design of experiments.

Mathematical modelling 
Likewise in numerical experiments and modelling uncertainty analysis draws upon a number of techniques for determining the reliability of model predictions, accounting for various sources of uncertainty in model input and design. A related field is sensitivity analysis.

Calibrated parameters and output 
A calibrated parameter does not necessarily represent reality, as reality is much more complex. Any prediction has its own complexities of reality that cannot be represented uniquely in the calibrated model; therefore, there is a potential error. Such errors must be accounted for when making management decisions on the basis of model outcomes.

See also
 Interval finite element method
 Uncertainty quantification
 Propagation of uncertainty
 Measurement uncertainty#Uncertainty evaluation

References

Bibliography

Etienne de Rocquigny, Nicolas, Devictor, Stefano, Tarantola (Editors), Uncertainty in Industrial Practice: A Guide to Quantitative Uncertainty Management, Wiley & Sons Publishers, 2008.  
J.C. Helton, J.D. Johnson, C.J. Salaberry, and C.B. Storlie, 2006, Survey of sampling based methods for uncertainty and sensitivity analysis. Reliability Engineering and System Safety, 91:1175–1209.
Santner, T. J.; Williams, B. J.; Notz, W.I. Design and Analysis of Computer Experiments; Springer-Verlag, 2003.

Measurement
Decision-making